The Angola national under-20 football team is the national under-20 football team of Angola and is controlled by the Angolan Football Federation. The team competes in the African U-20 Championship and the FIFA U-20 World Cup, which is held every four years.

Honours 
 African U-21 Championship:
 Winners (1): 2001

Tournament Records

FIFA U-20 World Cup record

CAF U-20 Championship record

Current squad
The following players were called for the 2019 Africa U-20 Cup of Nations qualification against Malawi on 13 May 2018.

Recent callups
The following players have been called up in the last twelve months.

See also 
 Angola national under-17 football team
 Angola national football team

References

African national under-20 association football teams
under-20